Carolina Crown Drum and Bugle Corps is a World Class competitive junior drum and bugle corps. Based in Fort Mill, South Carolina, Carolina Crown is a member corps of Drum Corps International (DCI). Carolina Crown won the 2013 Drum Corps International World Class Championship, the first former Open Class/Division II corps to do so.

History
The Carolina Crown organization was founded in 1988 as the Charlotte Drum Corps Association, a group of local drum corps fans who gathered on an irregular basis to talk about drum corps and watch drum corps video. The group hosted two drum corps shows, Southern Gold Classic at Davidson College and NightBEAT at Charlotte's Memorial Stadium. Southern Gold Classic drew a small audience and lost money. NightBEAT was much better attended, but the group was unable to pay the stadium rental. When the NightBEAT committee met with Charlotte Parks and Recreation Department to discuss working out some sort of payment schedule, they were surprised when they not only wrote off the bill for the 1988 NightBEAT but offered the a sponsorship for future shows. In 1989, a gift of $1000 was offered by the Queen City Optimists with the proviso that the organization start a performance group; after discussions initially centered on starting a drumline, the Carolina Crown Drum and Bugle Corps was born.

After the corps bought a complete set of drums from a defunct drum and bugle corps only to discover that they were seriously damaged, John Cummings of Ludwig Drums offered to repair the drums as part of an informal sponsorship of the corps. The name Carolina Crown was adopted to recognize the groups' desire to represent the Carolinas region while still recognizing Charlotte, the Queen City, which has a crown in its logo. The leadership group met, in the fall of 1989, with several young band directors who were also alumni of Suncoast Sound, Spirit of Atlanta, and the Madison Scouts drum and bugle corps to tell them of their efforts to start a new local corps. After locating and purchasing the horns of the defunct California Dons, Carolina Crown began recruiting members. The corps also formed a partnership with the Mecklenburg Council of the Boy Scouts of America as Explorer Post #588, which aided them in finding school space for auditions and practices.

In 1990, fielding a corps of only sixty-one members, Carolina Crown elected to compete in the Open Class (now known as World Class) in DCI. However, not only was the corps out-classed by the other, larger corps in Open Class, but it was also bested in DCI prelims by seven corps that had advanced from Classes A and A60, finishing thirty-third of 33 corps at their first DCI World Championships. In 1991, the corps dropped down to Class A. At the DCI Championships in Dallas, Carolina Crown finished in second place in Class A and advanced to Open Class prelims, where they placed twenty-fifth, earning DCI Associate membership. Carolina Crown was third in the 1992 Division II Championship, once more finishing in twenty-fifth place in Division I (which had been renamed from Open Class) prelims. At the 1993 DCI Championships, Carolina Crown won the Division II Championship title and finished in twenty-first place in Division I prelims.

After their championship in Division II, Carolina Crown opted to compete exclusively in Division I starting in 1994. That year, the corps finished seventeenth in DCI semifinals in Boston. In 1995, in only its sixth season, Carolina Crown earned a spot as one of the twelve finalists, placing eleventh overall. Since that first finals appearance, Carolina Crown has failed to make finals only once in 2002, finishing within the top five in finals every year since 2008. In 2013, the corps won the Drum Corps International World Class Championship with the first and only perfect brass score in finals history.

In 1995, the corps moved from Charlotte to Belmont, North Carolina. Following the 1997 season, the corps relocated to its present home of Fort Mill, South Carolina.

Show summary (1990–2022) 
Source:

Caption awards
At the annual World Championship Finals, Drum Corps International (DCI) presents awards to the corps with the highest average scores from prelims, semifinals, and finals in five captions. Carolina Crown has won these caption awards:

Jim Ott Best Brass Performance Award
 2009, 2011, 2012, 2013, 2016, 2017, 2019

John Brazale Best Visual Performance Award
 2012, 2013, 2016

Don Angelica Best General Effect Award
 2013, 2015

George Zingali Best Color Guard Award
 2016

References

External links
Official website

Drum Corps International World Class corps
Fort Mill, South Carolina
Musical groups established in 1988
1988 establishments in North Carolina